Nirupama Pathak was a 22-year-old woman who was found dead in her parents' house in Koderma district in the state of Jharkhand, India on April 29, 2010.

Suspects
Nirupama's mother, Subha Pathak, was suspected of "honor killing" her. Nirupama's journalist boyfriend Priyabhansu Ranjan was also accused of abetting her suicide.

Court verdict
Based on forensic evidence and a suicide note signed by Nirupama, the court ruled out murder.

References

Crime in Jharkhand